Hangzhou Wuyue Qiantang F.C. is a professional Chinese football club that currently participates in the China League Two. The team is based in Hangzhou, Zhejiang.

History
The club was created as a result of a collaboration between three local amateur football clubs in Hangzhou: Hangzhou Ange, Hangzhou Qimeng and Hangzhou T60 in 2017, its name derived from the historical kingdom of Wuyue that Hangzhou was once the capital of, as well as the historical name of the city, Qiantang.

In 2018, the team qualified for the play-off stage of 2018 Chinese Champions League. After beating Shenzhen Xinqiao and Shanxi Metropolis in the play-offs, the club advanced to the semi-finals, securing a spot in the final four of the highest level of Chinese amateur football, and gaining promotion to China League Two. Although their promotion was denied at first, they were finally granted a last-minute admission into 2019 China League Two after the dissolution of Yanbian Funde in China League One and the subsequent promotion of Shaanxi Chang'an Athletic, securing its final spot.

Before 2020 season, the club withdrew from China League Two.

Name changes
2017– Hangzhou Wuyue Qiantang F.C. 杭州吴越钱唐

Managerial history
  Gu Zhongqing (2017–2018)
  Milovan Prelević (2019) (Deceased)

Results
All-time league rankings

As of the end of 2019 season.

 In group stage.

Key
<div>

 Pld = Played
 W = Games won
 D = Games drawn
 L = Games lost
 F = Goals for
 A = Goals against
 Pts = Points
 Pos = Final position

 DNQ = Did not qualify
 DNE = Did not enter
 NH = Not Held
 WD = Withdrawal
 – = Does Not Exist
 R1 = Round 1
 R2 = Round 2
 R3 = Round 3
 R4 = Round 4

 F = Final
 SF = Semi-finals
 QF = Quarter-finals
 R16 = Round of 16
 Group = Group stage
 GS2 = Second Group stage
 QR1 = First Qualifying Round
 QR2 = Second Qualifying Round
 QR3 = Third Qualifying Round

References

External links

Football clubs in China
Association football clubs established in 2017